Andriy Petrovych Beshta (14 December 1976 – 30 May 2021) was a Ukrainian politician and diplomat. In November 2015, he became the Ukrainian Ambassador to Thailand, and in 2017, took up part-time positions as Ambassador to Laos and Myanmar. He held all three positions until his death in 2021.

Beshta died on 30 May 2021 from a heart attack on Ko Lipe, a resort island in Thailand's Satun Province. He was 44.

References

1976 births
2021 deaths
Ukrainian politicians
People from Volyn Oblast
University of Lviv alumni
Ambassadors of Ukraine to Thailand
Ambassadors of Ukraine to Laos
Ambassadors of Ukraine to Myanmar